The Charles Denby Garrison Sr. House is a historic residence near Prichard, Alabama, United States.  The -story house was designed by architect Kenneth R. Giddens for a local lumberman, Charles Denby Garrison Sr.  Completed in 1941, the design incorporates elements of the American Craftsman, Colonial Revival, and Classical Revival styles.  The architectural landscape in the United States following World War II came to be dominated by modern styles, such as the Ranch-style.  Due to its interwar period architectural significance, the house was added to the National Register of Historic Places on September 9, 2009.

References

Houses on the National Register of Historic Places in Alabama
National Register of Historic Places in Mobile County, Alabama
Houses in Mobile County, Alabama
Houses completed in 1941